The Whitworth rifle was an English-made percussion rifle used in the latter half of the 19th century.  A single-shot muzzleloader with excellent long-range accuracy for its era, especially when used with a telescopic sight, the Whitworth rifle was widely regarded as the world's first sniper rifle.

The Whitworth rifle saw extensive use with the Confederate sharpshooters in the American Civil War, claiming the lives of several Union generals, including Major General John Sedgwick, one of the highest-ranking Union officers killed during the Civil War, shot on 9 May 1864, at Spotsylvania.  In October 2017, a surviving example of a Confederate Whitworth rifle was auctioned with a hammer price of $161,000.

The Whitworth rifle was considered to be the very best rifle of its time in terms of accuracy, when compared to other British, French, American rifles, or those produced elsewhere.

History

The Whitworth rifle was designed by Sir Joseph Whitworth, a prominent British engineer and entrepreneur. Whitworth had experimented with cannons using polygonal rifling instead of traditional rifled barrels, which was patented in 1854. The hexagonal polygonal rifling meant that the projectile did not have to bite into grooves as was done with conventional rifling. In 1856, that concept was demonstrated in a series of experiments using brass howitzers.

Whitworth believed that the same type of system could be used to create a more accurate rifle to replace the Pattern 1853 Enfield, which had shown some weaknesses during the recent Crimean War. Trials were held in 1857 to compare Whitworth's design against the Enfield. The Whitworth rifle outperformed the Enfield at a rate of about three to one in the trials, which tested the accuracy and range of both weapons.

While the trials were generally a success for the Whitworth rifle, the British government ultimately rejected the design because the Whitworth's barrel was much more prone to fouling than the Enfield, and the Whitworth rifle also cost approximately four times as much to manufacture. The Whitworth Rifle Company was able to sell the weapon to the French army, and also to the Confederacy during the American Civil War.

Design and features

While the barrel design of the Whitworth rifle was innovative, the rest of the rifle was similar to other rifles and rifle-muskets used at the time. The rifle was muzzle loaded, and used a percussion lock firing mechanism. The lock mechanism was very similar to that used on the Enfield rifle-musket.

Whitworth chose to use a longer and more slender bullet than was common at the time, which resulted in a bore diameter of  caliber, significantly smaller than the Enfield's  caliber bore. Whitworth's bullets were more stable at longer ranges than the shorter and larger diameter bullets found in other rifles of the time. Soon .577 calibre was called "fullbore", and .451, used extensively in long range shooting sport, "smallbore". Whitworth also engineered the barrel with a 1-in- twist, quite a bit tighter than the 1-in- of the 1853 Enfield, or the later 1856/1858 variants with five-groove barrels and a 1-in- twist. The extra spin the tighter twist imparted to the projectile further stabilized the bullet in flight.

Other long-range rifles of the period tended to have much larger and heavier barrels, which made them too heavy for standard infantry use.

When being used by sharpshooters, Whitworth rifles were usually rested against a tree or log to increase their accuracy. Some sharpshooters carried their own forked rests for the rifle, so that a suitable rest was always available.

Use

In 1860, the British National Rifle Association held its first annual meeting at Wimbledon.

Britain was officially neutral during the American Civil War, but private arms manufacturers were not required to remain neutral. The Whitworth Rifle Company, for example, sold the rifle to the Confederacy. The Confederate soldiers that used these rifles were referred to as Whitworth Sharpshooters. They accompanied regular infantrymen, and were usually used to eliminate Union artillery gun crews.

The Whitworth was held responsible for at least two deaths of high-ranking officers. On 19 September 1863, at the Battle of Chickamauga, an unnamed Confederate sharpshooter mortally wounded Union General William Lytle, who was leading a charge at the time.

Shots from Confederate Whitworth rifles, easily identifiable due to the shrill whistling noises their hexagonal bullets made in flight, caused members of his staff and nearby artillerymen to duck for cover. Sedgwick strode around in the open and was quoted as saying, "What? Men dodging this way for single bullets? What will you do when they open fire along the whole line? I am ashamed of you. They couldn't hit an elephant at this distance." Although chastened, his men continued to flinch and he repeated, "I'm ashamed of you, dodging that way. They couldn't hit an elephant at this distance." Just seconds later he fell forward with a bullet hole below his left eye. At least five Confederate soldiers claimed that they had fired the fatal shot.

The Whitworth rifle with a hexagonal bore and rapid regular twist, when it was tested by the Union's Ordnance Committee, along with the
 Lancaster rifle with a smooth elliptical bore and an increasing twist;
 Westley Richards' breech loader with a Whitworth barrel; and the
 Enfield rifle of five grooves and regular twist of one turn in forty three inches;
was admitted to have surpassed all the others for accuracy at long ranges. No less than 1,000 rounds were fired from each rifle without cleaning. But as it required "...very peculiar long cartridges, it was thought these would be inconvenient for army purposes."

Variants

The barrel was attached to the stock using two or three barrel bands, depending on the barrel's length.

Two types of bullets were used in the Whitworth rifle: hexagonal and cylindrical. The cylindrical bullets had to be made out of soft pure lead, with a small hollow in the base. Recovered bullets were found to be as hexagonal as those which had been factory-made to a hexagonal shape. The hexagonal-form bullet did not need to expand to properly grip the barrel, and therefore could be made out of a harder lead alloy.

The sights used on Whitworth rifles varied. Others used a sliding blade sight with an adjustment for windage. Some had simple fixed front sights, while others used a post and globe front sight. A small number of Whitworth rifles were equipped with a four power telescopic sight, designed by Colonel Davidson which, unlike modern rifle scopes, was attached to the left side of the weapon instead of the top. While the telescopic sight was very advanced for its time, it had a reputation for leaving the user with a black eye due to the rifle's fairly substantial recoil.

Modern use
Previously, reproductions of Whitworth rifles were manufactured by Parker-Hale and Euroarms. In September 2015, Italian manufacturer Davide Pedersoli began the modern preproduction of Whitworth rifles. These reproductions are often used by Confederate re-enactors of the American Civil War, and by those who have an interest in muzzleloading firearms. All variants used in the American Civil War were "two-band" with  barrels, while, the reproduction rifles are all the longer-barreled, "three-band", civilian versions of the famed rifle.

See also
 British military rifles
 Rifles in the American Civil War

References

American Civil War rifles
Victorian-era weapons of the United Kingdom
Weapons of the Confederate States of America